Niedenzuella is a genus of flowering plants belonging to the family Malpighiaceae.

Its native range is Southern Tropical America. It is found in the countries of north-eastern Argentina, Bolivia, Brazil, Colombia, Costa Rica, Ecuador, French Guiana, Guyana, Panamá, Paraguay, Peru, Suriname and Venezuela. 

The genus name of Niedenzuella is in honour of Franz Josef Niedenzu (1857–1937), a German botanist born in Köppernig. He is remembered for his work with the botanical family Malpighiaceae. It was first described and published in Novon Vol.16 on page 194 in 2006.

Known species
According to Kew:

Niedenzuella acutifolia 
Niedenzuella caracasana 
Niedenzuella castanea 
Niedenzuella glabra 
Niedenzuella leucosepala 
Niedenzuella lucida 
Niedenzuella mater-dei 
Niedenzuella metensis 
Niedenzuella mogoriifolia 
Niedenzuella multiglandulosa 
Niedenzuella peruviana 
Niedenzuella poeppigiana 
Niedenzuella sericea 
Niedenzuella stannea 
Niedenzuella suaveolens 
Niedenzuella warmingiana

References

Malpighiaceae
Malpighiaceae genera
Plants described in 1845
Flora of Costa Rica
Flora of Panama
Flora of northern South America
Flora of western South America
Flora of Brazil
Flora of Northeast Argentina